Taylor Gray (born March 25, 2005) is an American professional stock car racing driver. He competes full-time in the NASCAR Craftsman Truck Series, driving the No. 17 Toyota Tundra for TRICON Garage.

Racing career

Early career
Gray made his debut in a late model in March 2018 at age 12, driving for Lee Faulk Racing and Development at Hickory Motor Speedway in the Paramount Auto Group Limited Late Model Series. He had an impressive showing, finishing sixth in the race. Two months later, he returned to Hickory in the same series and won his first late model race after running in either first or second place for the entire race.

Both Gray and his brother Tanner were signed by DGR-Crosley in 2019, with Tanner driving full-time in the K&N Pro Series East and Taylor driving full-time in the CARS Late Model Stock Tour since he was under the age of 15 and therefore not eligible to compete in a NASCAR series at that time.

In his season racing in CARS, Gray picked up a win at Hickory Motor Speedway in just his second start, which meant he now had two wins at the track. Gray ended the year ninth in points, competing in all but two races which he skipped mid-season. Additionally, he entered the ValleyStar Credit Union 300 NASCAR Whelen All-American Series race at Martinsville, where he flipped and his car came to a halt upside down, but he was uninjured in the crash. Just a few weeks later, he was already back in action, again at Hickory, where he ran the Whelen All-American Series' Fall Brawl event. Gray would have an outstanding performance, leading all 200 laps in the race en route to the win, and this put him with a total of three wins there at only age 14.

2020
On December 18, 2019, it was announced that Gray would drive all races in the ARCA Menards Series East (formerly the K&N Pro Series East) in 2020 with DGR in their No. 17 Ford (the team switched manufacturers from Toyota) once turning 15 on March 25 of that year. In addition, he will run the nine races of the 10-race ARCA Menards Series Sioux Chief Showdown that he will be able to compete in after he becomes eligible to race in the series. His older brother subbed for him at the season-opener at New Smyrna, and Bubba Pollard was announced to fill in at the following race at Five Flags. However, the Five Flags race along with all others through May were postponed due to the coronavirus outbreak, which means Gray would be 15 when the rescheduled race is run and eligible to compete in it after all. DGR has yet to announce who will drive the No. 17 car at that one race as a result of this, but since Gray is running full-time for the championship, they presumably would move Pollard to a second car for the team, which has been announced to be fielded in select races sometime in the season for Tanner Gray.

Gray also returned to the CARS Series part-time in 2020, winning their season-opener at Southern National Motorsports Park.

2021
On January 15, 2021, Gray was penalized for recording a video on his cell phone while on the track for an official ARCA test session at Daytona, a violation of the series rulebook's Section 20C – 6.7 (restriction of onboard devices, including cell phones). occurred during an official ARCA Menards Series test session at Daytona International Speedway. Gray was placed on probation for the rest of the season and fined $1,000.

Gray returned for another full-time season in the East Series in the No. 17 for the renamed David Gilliland Racing. He finished third in the season-opening race at New Smyrna Speedway in a photo finish with race winner Max Gutiérrez and second-place finisher Sammy Smith. On April 8, Gray suffered a fractured L4 vertebra, left foot, and ankle in a single-car accident in Statesville, North Carolina, forcing him to miss his NASCAR Camping World Truck Series debut at Richmond Raceway. He made his Truck debut at Watkins Glen International.

He was cleared to return on July 6, allowing him to run the weekend's ARCA race at Elko Speedway.

After ARCA West Rookie Jake Drew was penalized in the Portland 112 along with Eric Nascimento, Gray won his second ARCA West race. He later won at the Star Nursery 150.

Two High School Students, Samuel Thomas and Dresden Whitney made a documentary about Gray titled "Legacy".

2022
On March 8, 2022 a hauler carrying Gray's car on its way to Phoenix Raceway collided with a Honda Passport near Longview, Texas, killing hauler driver Steven C. Stotts. Two passengers in the hauler and the driver of the SUV survived the accident. Three days later on March 11, Gray won the General Tire 150 after starting second and leading 43 laps, dedicating the win to Stotts. He also won the ARCA East race at Dover with the new Ford Mustang body.

Personal life
He is the younger brother of Tanner Gray, who also drives for David Gilliland Racing in their No. 15 Ford F-150 in the NASCAR Camping World Truck Series as well as in select ARCA races. He is also the son of Shane Gray, an NHRA driver, and grandson of Johnny Gray, a Funny Car driver. One of his hobbies is wakeboarding.

Motorsports career results

NASCAR
(key) (Bold – Pole position awarded by qualifying time. Italics – Pole position earned by points standings or practice time. * – Most laps led.)

Craftsman Truck Series

ARCA Menards Series
(key) (Bold – Pole position awarded by qualifying time. Italics – Pole position earned by points standings or practice time. * – Most laps led.)

ARCA Menards Series East

 Season still in progress

ARCA Menards Series West

References

External links
 
 

Racing drivers from New Mexico
2005 births
Living people
People from Artesia, New Mexico
NASCAR drivers
ARCA Menards Series drivers